Sandfields East is an electoral ward and a community of Neath Port Talbot county borough, Wales.  It is part of the parliamentary constituency of Aberavon. The ward elects three county councillors to Neath Port Talbot County Borough Council.

Description
The community is coterminous with the electoral ward. Sandfields East is bounded by the wards of Sandfields West to the northwest, Aberavon to the northeast and Margam to the southeast.  It is bounded by Swansea Bay to the southwest.

At the 2011 UK Census the population of the community/ward was 6,895.

Sandfields East is a mostly urbanised ward and consists of council housing inland with private homes and old peoples accommodation near the beach area.  Neath Port Talbot Hospital is located in the ward.

County council elections
In the 2012 local council elections, the electorate turnout was 40.13%.  The councillors who were elected were:

Colin Crowly died after the election and a by-election was held to elect a replacement. The by-election took place on Thursday, 17 October 2013.  The turnout was 23.2% and the councillor elected was:

Mike Davies died after the election and a by-election was held to elect a replacement. The by-election took place on Thursday, 30 October 2014. The turnout was 20.72% and the councillor elected was:

In the 2017 local council elections, the councillors who were elected were:

References

Electoral wards of Neath Port Talbot
Communities in Neath Port Talbot

cy:Traethmelyn